Wulfenia is a plant genus in the family Plantaginaceae. The genus was named after Franz Xaver von Wulfen (1728–1805), an Austrian botanist, zoologist, mineralogist, alpinist, and Jesuit priest. It is also in Tribe Veroniceae.

Its native range is from Central Europe (Italy, Albania, Austria and Yugoslavia) to southern Turkey and northern Lebanon and Syria in western Asia.

Species 
Accepted by Plants of the World Online;
 Wulfenia baldaccii 
 Wulfenia carinthiaca 
 Wulfenia glanduligera 
 Wulfenia orientalis 

The genus is recognized by the United States Department of Agriculture and the Agricultural Research Service, but they only list the following species; Wulfenia amherstiana , Wulfenia baldaccii  and Wulfenia carinthiaca

References

External links 

Plantaginaceae
Plantaginaceae genera
Taxa named by Nikolaus Joseph von Jacquin
Plants described in 1781
Flora of Austria
Flora of Italy
Flora of Albania
Flora of Yugoslavia
Flora of Lebanon
Flora of Syria